Clive Anderson's Comedy Revolutions was a radio programme that originally aired from June 2004 to December 2005.  There were 12 half-hour episodes and it was broadcast on BBC Radio 2.  It starred Clive Anderson.

References 
 Lavalie, John. Clive Anderson's Comedy Revolutions. EpGuides. 21 Jul 2005. 29 Jul 2005  <http://epguides.com/CliveAndersonsComedyRevolutions/>.

BBC Radio 2 programmes
2004 radio programme debuts